Bogdanovka was a concentration camp for Jews that was established in Transnistria Governorate by the Romanian authorities during World War II as part of the Holocaust.

Location 
Three concentration camps were situated near the villages of Bogdanovka, Domanovka and Acmecetca on the Southern Bug river, in Golta district, Transnistria with Bogdanovka holding 54,000 people by the end of 1941. This is now the Ukrainian oblast Mykolajiw.

Massacres 
In December 1941, a few cases of typhus, which is a disease spread by lice and fleas, broke out in the camp. A decision was made by the German adviser to the Romanian administration of the district, and the Romanian District Commissioner to murder all the inmates. The Aktion began on December 21, and was carried out by Romanian soldiers, gendarmes, Ukrainian police, civilians from Golta, and local ethnic Germans under the commander of the Ukrainian regular police, Kazachievici. Thousands of disabled and ill inmates were forced into two locked stables, which were doused with kerosene and set ablaze, burning alive all those inside. Other inmates were led in groups to a ravine in a nearby forest and shot in their necks. The remaining Jews dug pits with their bare hands in the bitter cold, and packed them with frozen corpses. Thousands of Jews froze to death. A break was made for Christmas, but the killing resumed on December 28. By December 31, over 40,000 Jews had been killed.

See also

Notes

External links
 Yad Vashem

Nazi concentration camps
The Holocaust in Transnistria
Holocaust locations in Romania